Édouard Roger-Vasselin was the defending champion; however, he lost to Karol Beck in the quarterfinals.
Beck reached the final, but he withdrew before his match against Amer Delić.

Seeds

Draw

Finals

Top half

Bottom half

References
 Main Draw
 Qualifying Draw

BH Telecom Indoors - Singles
2011 Singles